Coastliner may refer to:

Coastliner (company), a bus operator in Blackpool and the surrounding area
Coastliner 700, a bus service operated by Stagecoach
Yorkshire Coastliner, bus services operated by Transdev Blazefield

See also
 Coast Line (disambiguation)
 Coastline